Nehzatabad (also Romanized as Nehẕatābād; also known as Deh-e Moḩammad Shāh and Mūsa) is a village in Derakhtengan Rural District, in the Central District of Kerman County, Kerman Province, Iran. At the 2006 census, its population was 59, in 17 families.

References 

Populated places in Kerman County